Dalitz is a surname. Notable people with the surname include:

Alwin Dalitz (1894–1969), Australian rules footballer 
Moe Dalitz (1899–1989), American gangster, businessman, casino owner, and philanthropist
Richard Dalitz (1925–2006), Australian physicist

See also
Dalit